Glipostenoda testaceicornis is a species of beetle in the genus Glipostenoda. It was described in 1931.

References

testaceicornis
Beetles described in 1931